The 1968–69 Botola is the 13th season of the Moroccan Premier League. Wydad Casablanca are the holders of the title.

References

Morocco 1968–69

Botola seasons
Morocco
Botola